The Edismith was an English automobile manufactured only in 1905.  Built by Edmund Smith of the Circus Garage in Blackburn, Lancashire, they came with either Tony Huber or De Dion power units.

See also
 List of car manufacturers of the United Kingdom

References

Defunct motor vehicle manufacturers of England
Companies based in Blackburn